Stephanie Forrester may refer to:

Stephanie Forrester (triathlete) (born 1969), British triathlete
Stephanie Forrester (The Bold and the Beautiful), a fictional character in the U.S. TV soap opera The Bold and the Beautiful